Black Is the Night: The Definitive Anthology is a 2-CD, career-spanning compilation album by the British punk rock band the Damned, released on 1 November 2019. It collects tracks from most of the band's studio albums between 1977 and 2018, as well as selected non-album singles and B-sides. It also includes the new track "Black Is the Night". Of the band's eleven studio albums to date, Not of This Earth (1995) and So, Who's Paranoid? (2008) are not represented on the anthology. All tracks were chosen by the band themselves, and sequenced thematically instead of chronologically.

Reception
AllMusic felt that "the track listing does make sense of the often elusive through line of the Damned's history, as Dave Vanian's showman's vocals, Captain Sensible's clever melodies, and their smarter-than-you-think wit unites the music as they travel from punk to garage rock to hard rock to pop to goth to a few pit stops in between." AllMusic noted that the inclusion of some of the band's more recent material "shows they're still in touch with their various muses, and for all their sonic shape-shifting, this is a far more consistent listening experience than one would expect." 

With no tracks represented from Not Of This Earth and So, Who's Paranoid?, the Big Takeover wrote that the anthology was "not fully representative" and "omissions from these albums is questionable."

Track listing
Disc one

Disc two

Personnel
Credits adapted from the liner notes of the original albums and singles, except where noted. 

The Damned
Dave Vanian – vocals, synthesizer (disc two: 15)  
Captain Sensible – bass, backing vocals (disc one: 12–16, 18–20, 23); guitar, keyboards, backing vocals (disc one: 1–11, 17, 21, 22, 24 / disc two: 2, 5, 7, 8, 10–15)
Rat Scabies – drums, backing vocals (disc one: 1–5, 7–24 / disc two: 1–10, 12–14) 
Brian James – guitar, backing vocals (disc one: 12–16, 18–20, 23) 
Lu Edmonds – guitar (disc one: 18) 
Algy Ward – bass (disc one: 1, 4, 8, 10, 11, 21, 24 / disc two: 2)
Paul Gray – bass (disc one: 2, 3, 5, 7, 9, 22 / disc two: 5, 7, 8, 10–15) 
Roman Jugg – keyboard solos (disc one: 3, 5, 9 / disc two: 12, 14); guitar, keyboards, backing vocals (disc two: 1, 3, 4, 6, 9) 
Bryn Merrick – bass, backing vocals (disc two: 1, 3, 4, 6, 9) 
Monty Oxymoron – keyboards, backing vocals (disc one: 6 / disc two: 11, 15) 
Patricia Morrison – bass, backing vocals (disc one: 6) 
Pinch – drums, backing vocals (disc one: 6 / disc two: 11, 15) 
Additional musicians
Simon Lloyd – brass (disc one: 3)
Anthony More – synthesizer (disc one: 17)
Gary Barnacle – saxophone, brass (disc two: 3, 6)
Ray Martinez – trumpet (disc two: 5)
Luís Jardim – percussion (disc two: 6)
Hanz Zimmer – synthesizer (disc two: 7, 10)
Kurt Holm – trumpet (disc two: 9)
Robert Fripp – guitar (disc two: 13)
Technical
Nick Lowe – producer (disc one: 12–16, 19, 20, 23)
Nick Mason – producer (disc one: 18)
Shel Talmy – producer (disc one: 14, 15)
The Damned – producer (disc one: 1–5, 7–11, 17, 21 / disc two: 2, 3, 5, 7, 8, 10, 12, 14)
Roger Armstrong – producer (disc one: 1, 4, 7, 8, 10, 11, 21 / disc two: 2)
Ed Hollis – producer (disc one: 24)
Hanz Zimmer – producer (disc two: 7)
Tony Mansfield – producer (disc one: 22)
Hugh Jones – producer (disc one: 5, 9)
Jon Kelly – producer (disc two: 1, 4, 6, 9)
Bob Sargeant – producer (disc two: 3)
Captain Sensible – producer (disc two: 13)
David Bianco – producer (disc one: 6) 
Tony Visconti – producer (disc two: 11) 
Tom Dalgety – producer (disc two: 15)
Phil Smee – cover, artwork
Ben Thomas – layout 
Eugene Butcher –  liner notes
Neil Brabiner –  photography 
Dod Morrison – photography

Charts

References

2019 compilation albums
The Damned (band) albums